The Springuel was a Belgian automobile manufactured from 1907 until 1912. The company called Societe Anonyme Automobiles des Springuel was founded by Jules Springuel-Wilmotte in Huy. It was a 24 hp pair-cast four, built in small numbers.  The company merged with Impéria in 1912. The 1911 12HP won the Grand Prix of Belgium in 1913.

References
David Burgess Wise, The New Illustrated Encyclopedia of Automobiles.

Defunct motor vehicle manufacturers of Belgium
Vintage vehicles
Huy